Daniel Addo (born 6 March 1987) is a Ghanaian football defensive midfielder. He previously played for clubs like Gençlerbirliği S.K., Hacettepespor and Hapoel Petah Tikva.

Club career
Addo began his professional career at Kessben F.C., moving in July 2014 to Accra Hearts of Oak SC. After just six months in Accra, he left the team and was transferred to Gençlerbirliği S.K., he joining also with his former Kessben teammate James Boadu to Turkey. In June 2009 left Gençlerbirliği S.K. and joined on loan to Hacettepespor the deal runs between 30 June 2010. He moved to Israel and signed for Hapoel Petah Tikva in January 2010.

International career
On November 13, 2007, Addo was first called to Ghana's national side, making the squad-of-23 for the match against Nigeria, being subsequently picked for the 40-man training camp for the 2008 African Cup of Nations.

References

External links
Gençlerbirliği profile 

1987 births
Living people
Ghanaian footballers
Expatriate footballers in Turkey
Expatriate footballers in Israel
Gençlerbirliği S.K. footballers
Hapoel Petah Tikva F.C. players
Hapoel Ramat Gan F.C. players
Ghanaian expatriate sportspeople in Israel
Association football midfielders
Ghanaian expatriate sportspeople in Turkey
Medeama SC players
Israeli Premier League players
Liga Leumit players